Vivobarefoot is a minimalist running shoe company. Their technology, invented by Tim Brennan and developed by British shoe company Terra Plana, is aimed at offering the optimum biomechanics and posture commonly associated with walking barefoot and barefoot running, and advocated within the barefoot movement and barefoot running community. Their marketing describes the walking experience as "as close to going barefoot in the city as you can get." The most prominent shoe using this technology is their Evo running shoe.

See also
 Barefoot running
 Minimalist shoe
 Vibram FiveFingers
 Xero Shoes

References

External links
 
 Wiggling Their Toes at the Shoe Giants, The New York Times, 30 August 2008
 Vivobarefoot Finland
 Vivobarefoot Germany

Athletic shoe brands
Sporting goods manufacturers of the United Kingdom
Minimalist clothing